Jordan Herdman-Reed (born July 21, 1994) is a professional Canadian football linebacker for the BC Lions of the Canadian Football League (CFL). He played college football with the Simon Fraser Clan.

Professional career

BC Lions
Herdman-Reed was drafted 60th overall in the 2017 CFL Draft by the Lions and signed with the team on May 23, 2017. He played in his first regular season game in the team's season opener on June 24, 2017 against the Edmonton Eskimos. He played in all 18 games where he recorded two defensive tackles and 19 special teams tackles. In 2018, he again played in 18 regular season games, but featured more prominently on defense as he had 56 defensive tackles, 17 special teams tackles, and two sacks. He also played in his first playoff game on November 11, 2018 where he recorded four defensive tackles in the Lions' loss to the Hamilton Tiger-Cats.

For the 2019 season, Herdman-Reed played in 16 regular season games and had 37 defensive tackles, eight special teams tackles, one sack, and one forced fumble as the team struggled to a 5-13 season. He did not play in 2020 due to the cancellation of the 2020 CFL season and his contract expired in 2021.

Saskatchewan Roughriders
On the first day of free agency in 2021, Herdman-Reed signed with the Saskatchewan Roughriders on February 9, 2021. He played in nine regular season games where he recorded one defensive tackle and two special teams tackles. He became a free agent upon the expiry of his contract on February 8, 2022. After initially remaining unsigned to start the 2022 season, Herdman-Reed re-signed with the Roughriders on August 8, 2022. He played in eight regular season games where he recorded four special teams tackles. He became a free agent upon the expiry of his contract on February 14, 2023.

BC Lions (II)
On February 15, 2023, it was announced that Herdman-Reed had re-signed with the BC Lions.

Personal life
Herdman-Reed's twin brother, Justin Herdman-Reed, who is two minutes younger, also plays professionally as a linebacker for the Saskatchewan Roughriders. Their father, James Reed, was also a professional linebacker who played for the Philadelphia Eagles, Winnipeg Blue Bombers, Montreal Concordes, New Orleans Breakers, Washington Federals, Saskatchewan Roughriders, and Toronto Argonauts.

References

External links
BC Lions bio

1994 births
Living people
BC Lions players
Canadian football linebackers
Saskatchewan Roughriders players
Simon Fraser Clan football players
Canadian football people from Winnipeg
Players of Canadian football from Manitoba
Canadian twins
Twin sportspeople